Audrey Niffenegger (born June 13, 1963) is an American writer, artist and academic. Her debut novel, The Time Traveler's Wife, published in 2003, was a bestseller.

Biography 
Audrey Niffenegger was born in 1963 in South Haven, Michigan. Then she moved to Evanston, Illinois and has since spent a majority of her life in Chicago.  Niffenegger started writing books when she was six years old. Niffenegger completed her undergraduate degree at the Art Institute of Chicago where she worked on becoming a visual artist. After completing her undergraduate degree, she got her M.F.A at Northwestern University. Niffenegger is currently a  professor in the Department of Creative Writing at Columbia College Chicago, where she co-founded the Columbia College Chicago Center for the Book and Paper Arts. Niffenegger is also the founding member of T3 or Text 3, an artist and writer's group which also performs and exhibits in Chicago. She is an alumna and board member of the Ragdale Foundation. She started making books herself by using processes such as intaglio and letterpress. She also wrote many novels which were produced on an offset press.

Novels
Niffenegger's debut novel, The Time Traveler's Wife, was published in 2003 and was a bestseller. A film adaptation was released in 2009. Niffenegger has no intention of watching the movie because she stated that the characters are only truly hers in the book, not in the movie. Niffenegger originally conceptualized The Time Traveler's Wife as a graphic novel but realized that the time travel would be difficult to capture in visualizations.
In March 2009, Niffenegger sold her second novel, a literary ghost story called Her Fearful Symmetry, to Charles Scribner's Sons for an advance of $5 million. The book was released on October 1, 2009 and is set in London's Highgate Cemetery where, during research for the book, Niffenegger acted as a tour guide. Though not as huge a commercial juggernaut as The Time Traveler's Wife, this book generally garnered more positive critical reviews and cinched Niffenegger's reputation as a leading novelist of ideas and atmosphere.

Niffenegger collaborated with Wayne McGregor on a balletic fable, Raven Girl (2013), performed at the Royal Opera House in London in 2013, 2015.

In 2009, she started working on a novel called The Chinchilla Girl in Exile.

In 2013 it was announced that there would be a sequel to The Time Traveler's Wife and in 2022 it was announced that title is The Other Husband set to be released in 2023.

Visual books
Niffenegger has degrees from the Art Institute of Chicago and Northwestern University. As an undergraduate student at the Art Institute of Chicago, Niffenegger created her own book arts major combining etching, letterpress arts and bookbinding. Her first project was called The Adventuress, which she self-described as "a novel In pictures". Niffenegger's second novel in pictures was titled The Three Incestuous Sisters which she created while completing her M.F.A. at Northwestern. These two novels in pictures were subsequently published by Harry N. Abrams. The Three Incestuous Sisters was published in 2005 and tells the story of three unusual sisters who live in a seaside house; the book has been compared to the work of Edward Gorey. The Adventuress was released on September 1, 2006.

The 2004 short story "The Night Bookmobile" was serialized in 2008 in "Visual Novel" format in The Guardian.  "The Night Bookmobile" was published on October 1, 2010, by Jonathan Cape. Niffenegger intends "The Night Bookmobile" to be the first installment in a series titled "The Library". She is working on the second installment, called "Moths of the New World", about a stolen book.

Personal life 

Niffenegger is married to cartoonist Eddie Campbell. Niffenegger and Campbell collaborated on the visual novel Bizarre Romance to celebrate the Comics Unmasked exhibit at the British Library. Niffenegger describes herself as "somewhere in the spectrum of agnosticism and atheism" and ascribes her disbelief to her Catholic background.

Bibliography

Novels
 The Time Traveler's Wife (2003)
 Her Fearful Symmetry (2009)
 Raven Girl (2013)
 The Other Husband (to be published in 2023)

Short stories
 "Jakob Wywialowski and the Angels" (2004)
 "Prudence: The Cautionary Tale of a Picky Eater" in the book Poisonous Plants at Table (2006)

Comics
 The Night Bookmobile (2008)
 Bizarre Romance (with Eddie Campbell, Abrams, 2018)

Artist's books
Visual books:
 The Adventuress (1985)
 The Spinster (1986)
 Aberrant Abecedarium (1986)
 The Murderer
 Spring (1994)
 The Three Incestuous Sisters (2005)

Non-fiction
 Awake in the Dream World: The Art of Audrey Niffenegger (2013), with Susan Fisher Sterling and Mark Pascale

Anthologies
 Ghostly : A Collection of Ghost Stories (Scribner, 2015)  An anthology selected and illustrated by Audrey Niffenegger.  She also wrote the introduction.

Books Foreworded by Niffenegger 
 The Art of Neil Gaiman (with Hayley Campbell, Neil Gaiman)
 Classic Penguin : Cover to Cover ( Paul Buckley)
 Mr. Wrong : Real-Life Stories about the Men We Used to Love (Jacquelyn Mitchard, Harriet Brown, et al.)

Adaptations 

 The Time Traveler's Wife (2009), film directed by Robert Schwentke, based on novel The Time Traveler's Wife
 The Time Traveler's Wife (2022), series directed by David Nutter, based on novel The Time Traveler's Wife

References

External links

 
 Interview with Audrey Niffenegger, December 2008

 Printworks Gallery, Art gallery representing Audrey Niffenegger
 
Interview with Writer Unboxed 3/06 about craft, the process of writing and editing, Time Traveler's Wife, The Three Incestuous Sisters, Her Fearful Symmetry, more.
Feature-length radio interview on KGNU with Claudia Cragg discussing 'Her Fearful Symmetry'
 Audrey Niffenegger Papers at Newberry Library
 Audrey Niffenegger on Meet The Writers, Monocle 24 talking to Georgina Godwin
Two-part interview conducted by Henk de Berg (2019) on Niffenegger's career, "The Time Traveler's Wife" and its sequel, "The Other Husband": part 1  part 2

1963 births
Living people
20th-century American women artists
21st-century American novelists
21st-century American poets
21st-century American women writers
American agnostics
American former Christians
American women novelists
American women poets
Columbia College Chicago faculty
American contemporary artists
Evanston Township High School alumni
Former Roman Catholics
Northwestern University alumni
People from South Haven, Michigan
Women romantic fiction writers
Women science fiction and fantasy writers
Writers from Chicago
Novelists from Michigan
Writers of time travel romance
Novelists from Illinois
American women academics
Inkpot Award winners